Alessandro Juliani (born 6 July 1975) is a Canadian actor and singer. He is notable for playing the roles of Tactical Officer Lieutenant Felix Gaeta on the Sci-Fi Channel television program Battlestar Galactica, Emil Hamilton in Smallville, Jacapo Sinclair on The CW series The 100, and Dr. Cerberus on the Netflix series Chilling Adventures of Sabrina. He is also known for voicing the character L in the English version of the anime series Death Note and its live action films, as well as several other animation projects. Juliani provided the voice of Aaron Fox on Nexo Knights.

Early life
Juliani was born to John Juliani, a producer, actor and writer, and Donna Wong, who co-founded Savage God and Opera Breve in Vancouver. He graduated from McGill University in Montreal, where he earned a Bachelor of Music in Vocal/Opera Performance.

Career
He was the voice of Pit/Kid Icarus in the Captain N: The Game Master cartoon series, and offered his voice in many other cartoons and anime including the English version of Death Note's L, Ranma ½ (as Toma), X-Men: Evolution (as Gambit), the three My Scene films (in the role of River) and two of the Bionicle films (as Toa Vakama). He played the voice of Nightscream in Beast Machines, he was also the voice of Julian in Barbie as the Princess and the Pauper, a Barbie movie based on the Mark Twain story The Prince and the Pauper, in which he also performed his own singing; he also voiced the merman prince Nalu in Barbie: Fairytopia and Barbie: Mermaidia, and most recently did both the speaking and singing role of Prince Antonio in Barbie as the Island Princess. He was also in the movie Barbie Mariposa as "Prince Carlos" and My Scene Goes Hollywood: The Movie as River. He also voices the character Koji in the English version of Ōban Star-Racers. Made his TV debut at age 11 in the MacGyver episode "The Madonna. He also played two minor roles in Stargate SG-1 as Eliam in the Season 4 episode Scorched Earth and Katep in Season 8's finale episodes Moebius: Part 1 and 2. He voices the character L in the anime series Death Note and its dubbed live action counterpart. He was also in the two-night Syfy event Alice as the 9 of Clubs. He appeared in the web series Riese as Garin. He played a small role as "Druid" in the TV series Dark Angel.

In addition to his television and film work, Juliani frequently appears on stage, both in Vancouver (where he has earned multiple nominations and wins for Vancouver theatre's Jessie Awards) and elsewhere. In Vancouver, he has been in productions staged by Bard on the Beach, Vancouver Playhouse, and the Vancouver Opera. Further afield, he has appeared in the Aldeburgh Festival in England and the Orlando Shakespeare Festival.

In 2002 he played a grieving Chinese opera performer in Ann Marie Fleming's short film Blue Skies.

Battlestar Galactica

In 2003, the 1978 television series, Battlestar Galactica was brought back to the small screen in what was termed a "reimagined" form, as a three-hour miniseries. The project was written and produced by Ronald D. Moore and directed by Michael Rymer. Alessandro Juliani starred as Felix Gaeta, a lieutenant in the Colonial Fleet. The miniseries effectively served as pilot for a potential TV series which was later commissioned in a collaborative effort between the Sci Fi Channel and Sky TV (the British broadcaster). Battlestar Galactica (2004–2009) was filmed mostly in Vancouver, British Columbia, Canada.

In the episode "Guess What's Coming to Dinner?", Alessandro's vocal skills were featured prominently. His character's singing is explained as a method of dealing with the pain of a severe physical injury.  His voice is heard often when flashing through other scenes and characters.

In March 2009, Juliani won the Streamy Award for Best Male Actor in a Dramatic Web Series for his work in the webisode, Battlestar Galactica: The Face of the Enemy.

Juliani sings in Gaeta's Lament, the first track of the Battlestar Galactica Season 4 soundtrack.

Post Battlestar Galactica
Juliani had a small part in the 2009 movie Watchmen, as a Rockefeller Military Base Technician. From April 2009 to May 2011, Juliani appeared on Smallville as Dr. Emil Hamilton. The actor will be narrating a twenty-five part serialization of Robert J. Sawyer's Rollback for CBC Radio One. In December 2009, Juliani appeared in the Syfy miniseries Alice, and the web series Riese. In the Battlestar Galactica spinoff Caprica episode "End of Line", Juliani sang in an opera composed for the episode's soundtrack by Bear McCreary.
In 2010, Juliani appeared in Riverworld on the SyFy Channel. In the summer of 2010, he played Henry V in Bard on the Beach's productions of Shakespeare's  Falstaff and Henry V in Vancouver, British Columbia. Juliani has performed the narration for audio books, including METAtropolis and in 2011 Stanislaw Lem's Solaris: The Definitive Edition. In 2012, he narrated for a new audio book version of Roger Zelazny's Chronicles of Amber. In 2013 Juliani played a minor role in Man of Steel as Officer Sekowsky. From 2014 to 2017, Juliani had a recurring role as Sinclair, a member of the Ark crew on The CW science fiction series The 100. In October 2020, he played Adam in the Supernatural episode "Unity".

Voice filmography

Animation

 Alien Racers – Undermaster Akhil
 Barbie: Fairytopia – Prince Nalu
 Barbie Mariposa – Prince Carlos
 Barbie: Mermaidia – Nalu
 Barbie as the Island Princess – Prince Antonio
 Barbie as the Princess and the Pauper – Julian
 Barbie in Rock 'n Royals – Clive
 Beast Machines – Nightscream
 Bionicle 2: Legends of Metru Nui – Toa Vakama, Matoran Vakama
 Bionicle 3: Web of Shadows – Toa Vakama
 Captain N: The Game Master – Kid Icarus
 The Condor – Chato
 Dinosaur Train – Martin
 Doggie Daycare – Beau
 G.I. Joe: Spy Troops – Dusty
 Gigantosaurus (TV series) - T-Rex
 Gobots – Buzzer-Bot
 Help! I'm a Fish – Chuck
 Littlest Pet Shop: A World of Our Own – Gavin Chamelle, Mayor Perrito, Others
 My Scene: Jammin' in Jamaica – River 
 Kong: King of the Apes – Chatter
 LeapFrog Letter Factory Adventures DVD Series – Leap
 Lego Ninjago: Masters of Spinjitzu – Kapau, Okino
 The Little Prince (2010 TV series) – Atsign (The Planet of Carapodes)
 Ratchet & Clank – Solana Trooper
 Super Dinosaur – Dexter Dynamo
 X-Men: Evolution – Gambit
 Nexo Knights – Aaron Fox
 My Scene: Masquerade Madness – River
 My Scene Goes Hollywood: The Movie – River

Live action English dubbing
Death Note - L
Death Note 2: The Last Name - L
L: Change the World - L Lawliet
Chilling Adventures of Sabrina - Dr. Cerberus
Big Sky - Doctor (1x07 - I Fall to Pieces)

Anime
 Death Note – L – 2008 Society for the Promotion of Japanese Animation Award, Best Voice Actor (English)
 Oban Star-Racers – Koji
 Ranma ½: Nihao My Concubine – Prince Toma
 Zoids Fuzors – Burton

Video games
 Hot Wheels Battle Force 5 – Zoom Takazumi
 My Scene Goes Hollywood: The Movie – River
 Dead Rising 2 – Reed Wallbeck
 Devil Kings – Frost
 Kessen – Hidetada Tokugawa/Hideaki Kobayakawa/Hidemoto Mori/Natoaka Yi/Tadatomo Honda

References

External links

 
 Alessandro Juliani at Battlestarwiki.org (longer biography)
 

20th-century Canadian male actors
21st-century Canadian male actors
Canadian male television actors
Canadian male voice actors
Canadian male web series actors
Living people
McGill University School of Music alumni
Streamy Award winners
Canadian male film actors
Year of birth missing (living people)